Leucopogon nitidus is a species of flowering plant in the heath family Ericaceae and is endemic to a small area in Western Australia. It is an erect, open shrub with hairy young branchlets, linear or very narrowly elliptic leaves and erect, compact clusters of 3 to 8 white flowers on the ends of branches and in upper leaf axils.

Description
Both surfaces of the leaves shiny, the upper surface with a few hairs and the lower surface with two longitudinal grooves.

Taxonomy and naming
Leucopogon nitidus was first formally described in 2012 by Michael Clyde Hislop in the journal Nuytsia from specimens he collected near Kojarena in 2008. The specific epithet (nitidus) means "shining" or "bright", referring to the leaves.

Distribution and habitat
This leucopogon grows in heathland in shallow sandy soil occurs in a small area east of Geraldton in the Geraldton Sandplains bioregion of Western Australia.

Conservation status
Leucopogon nitidus is listed as "Threatened" by the Western Australian Government Department of Biodiversity, Conservation and Attractions, meaning that it is in danger of extinction.

References

nitidus
Ericales of Australia
Flora of Western Australia
Plants described in 2012